Gorm is a natural gas and oilfield in the Danish Sector of North Sea that was discovered in 1971. It is the largest oilfield exploited by Denmark. The field consists of five platforms and is operated by TotalEnergies. The facilities include two wellhead platforms and several processing platforms. About  of crude oil from the nearby Rolf oil field are processed on the Gorm platforms.

The installations developed for the Gorm field were:

An oil leak occurred in the field on 2 March 2011.

See also 

 Tyra field
 Dan oil field

References

External links

The Gorm Centre. Danish Energy Agency

Natural gas fields in Denmark
Oil fields of Denmark
North Sea energy
Maersk Oil

TotalEnergies